Vira Hyrych (also transliterated Vira Ghyrytch; 1967 – 28 April 2022) was a Ukrainian journalist and radio producer.

Biography
Hyrych was born in 1967. In 2018, she began working for Radio Free Europe/Radio Liberty's Radio Svoboda.

She previously worked for the Israeli embassy in Ukraine.

Her colleague Maryana Drach, publishing editor of Radio Liberty specifies that she was investigating the ecological trace left by the Russian fleet in the Black Sea.

Death
She was killed on 28 April 2022, during the Russian invasion of Ukraine after the building in Kyiv where she lived was hit by a Russian missile attack. 

Her death happened while UN Secretary General António Guterres was in Kyiv. The bombing was condemned by the French Ministry for Europe and Foreign Affairs' Jean-Yves Le Drian.

See also 
 List of journalists killed during the Russo-Ukrainian War

References 

1967 births
2022 deaths
21st-century Ukrainian journalists
Journalists killed while covering the 2022 Russian invasion of Ukraine
Civilians killed in the Russian invasion of Ukraine
Ukrainian radio producers
Radio Free Europe/Radio Liberty people
Women radio producers